Lists of computers cover computers, or programmable machines, by period, type, vendor and region.

Early computers

List of vacuum tube computers
List of transistorized computers
List of early microcomputers
List of computers with on-board BASIC
List of computers running CP/M

More recent computers

List of home computers
List of home computers by video hardware
List of fastest computers
Lists of microcomputers
Lists of mobile computers
List of fictional computers

Vendor-specific

HP business desktops
List of Macintosh models grouped by CPU type
List of TRS-80 and Tandy-branded computers
List of VAX computers

Regional

List of British computers
List of computer systems from Croatia
List of computer systems from Serbia
List of computer systems from Slovenia
List of computer systems from the Socialist Federal Republic of Yugoslavia
List of Soviet computer systems

See also